= Pseudomedon =

Scientific classification
- Domain: Eukaryota
- Kingdom: Animalia
- Phylum: Arthropoda
- Class: Insecta
- Order: Coleoptera
- Suborder: Polyphaga
- Infraorder: Staphyliniformia
- Family: Staphylinidae
- Genus: Pseudomedon; Mulsant & Rey, 1878

Genus of beetles

Pseudomedon is a genus of beetles belonging to the family Staphylinidae.

The species of this genus are found in Europe and Northern America.

Species:

- Pseudomedon afghanicus Assing, 2008
- Pseudomedon alabamae Casey, 1905
